Dhiffushi (Dhivehi: ދިއްފުށި) is one of the inhabited islands of Kaafu Atoll.

Geography 
It is located next to Meerufenfusi. 

Dhiffushi is the most eastern inhabited island in the Maldives and hence the island witnesses sunrise first in the country.

Demography

Governance
In accordance with the recently passed Decentralization Act of Maldives, Dhiffushi is governed by an elected Island Council composed of three Councillors. The Council is headed by the President of the Council. The Island Council reports to the Local Government Authority (LGA). As democracy and decentralization are at the infant stage in the Maldives, the councilors, and the government may find it difficult to deal with important issues like land, and resource utilization.

Economy 
Dhiffushi is the leading island in the Local Guesthouse industry the Maldives. The island is famous for its hospitality and friendliness of the people while there are a variety of guesthouses run by locals along with a few guest shops opened up for business.

Infrastructure
The island has a pre school, public school, hospital, two mosques, Magistrate court, gas station, football turf  and sewage plant .

As of the beginning of 2012 Dhiffushi council has started to build an industrial area next to the harbor in order to claim additional land, the land has been used for commercial industrial use.

Transport

Public ferry
 Everyday except Friday 
 Takes 2 hrs 10 mins 
 Tickets per person MVR 22
 Leaves from Male' at Villingili Ferry Terminal at 2:30pm. The ferry dhoni arrives at the island at 4:40 pm 
 Leaves from Dhiffushi to Male' at 6:30 am. The ferry dhoni arrives at Male' at 08:40 am

Fast ferry 
A speedboat ride of 40 mins. 
 
From Saturday to Thursday, this ferry leaves from Male' to Dhiffushi at 4:30 pm in front of the Bank of Ceylon. The return journey from Dhiffushi to Male' leaves at 7:30 am. On Fridays, the journey from Male to Dhiffushi is at 8:30 am and 7:00 pm. The return journey from Dhiffushi to Male' is at 5:00 pm.

Guest Houses in Dhiffushi 
There are more than 20 Guest Houses in Dhiffushi Island.

1. Crown Beach Hotel
2. Crown Beach Villas
3. Rashu Hiyaa
4. The Captains Residence
5. Dhiffushi White Sand Beach
6. Ameera Guest House
7. Captain's Sunset Lodge
8. Crystal Dhiffushi
9. The Home Maldives
10. Veli Vilaa
11. Araamu Holidays and Spa
12. Ranauraa Inn
13. Ohana Maldives
14. Dhiffushi Inn
15. Sea Side Villa
16. Club Kaafu
17. Infinity Dhiffushi
18. Portia and Spa
19. Ithaa Hiyaa
20. Nirili Villa
21. Isla Dhiffushi
22. Blu Dhiffushi

Notable people
Ahmed Rizuvan -football player

References

Islands of the Maldives